The Japan-Taiwan Jingying is a Go competition consisting of players from Japan and Taiwan. The style is a knockout with 16 players, eight each from Japan and Taiwan.

Past winners and runners-up

References

International Go competitions